Veronika Machyniaková (born 14 September 1997 in Hronec) is a Slovakian biathlete. She competed at the  2022 Winter Olympics, in Women's sprint, Women's pursuit, and  Women's relay. She competed at the Biathlon World Championships 2020.

References

External links

Living people
1997 births
Slovak female biathletes
Olympic biathletes of Slovakia
Biathletes at the 2022 Winter Olympics
People from Brezno District
Sportspeople from the Banská Bystrica Region